Hohnderfeldbach  is a river of North Rhine-Westphalia, Germany that flows through the Lengsdorf district in Bonn. Since the 1970s, the river sparsely flows on account of holes in the piping as well as a Bundesgrenzschutz hall functioning as a receptacle for water.

References

See also
List of rivers of North Rhine-Westphalia

Rivers of North Rhine-Westphalia
Rivers of Germany